Johannes Lodewikus 'Wikus' van Heerden (born 25 February 1979 in Johannesburg) is a South African former rugby union player who played as a flanker. He finished his career playing for the Lions in Super Rugby, and the Golden Lions in the national Currie Cup competition. Van Heerden also won 14 caps for the South Africa national team, the Springboks. Before his move to the Bulls, he was the captain of the Cats (now known as the Lions). 

He announced his retirement during the 2012 Currie Cup Premier Division season.

Career
Van Heerden made his debut for the Springboks on 7 June 2003 as flanker against Scotland at Kings Park in Durban. South Africa won the match 29 points to 25. He played at flanker for the second Test against the Scottish a week later at Ellis Park, which South Africa also won, 28 to 19.

He was subsequently including in South Africa's 2003 Tri Nations Series squad. He played against the Wallabies at Newlands, which the Springboks won 26 to 22. He also played against the All Blacks at Loftus Versfeld, and was a reserve in another match against Australia at Suncorp Stadium, both of which the Springboks lost.

Van Heerden had a good 2007 Super 14 campaign with the Bulls as the team's specialist fetcher. His best game was in the Bulls’ 92–3 win against the Reds at Loftus, scoring two tries in the process. This led to him being selected into the Springboks. In July 2007, Van Heerden played his first Test in four years, against the Wallabies in Sydney. He played very well in this match, being regarded as the best Bok forward, albeit in a second string Springbok XV. He was equally impressive in the match against the All Blacks in Christchurch a week later. These performances lead to his inclusion in the Springbok's victorious 2007 Rugby World Cup squad.

On 16 May 2008 it was confirmed that he would join Guinness Premiership side Saracens in November 2008 following his Currie Cup commitments with the Bulls. He scored a try on his debut for Saracens in a 27–14 defeat against London Irish at the Madejski Stadium on 23 November.

On 18 March 2010, it was confirmed that Saracens had released him to return to South Africa where he would play for the Lions. This was a surprise, as Saracens had indicated he would see out the season with the club. In his first super rugby season back in South Africa he broke his arm but was back for the first match of the Curriecup. Unfortunately he broke his arm again in exactly the same place in this match, putting him out for several weeks. His father is former Springbok Lock Moaner van Heerden.

Honours
 2007 Super Rugby winner (Bulls)
 2007 Rugby World Cup winner (Springboks)
 2011 Currie Cup winner (Golden Lions)

References

External links
Wikus van Heerden on the Springbok Rugby Hall of Fame
Wikus van Heerden on sarugby.com
Lions profile
Wikus van Heerden to Captain Lions Team
Profile on Saracens official website

1979 births
Living people
Rugby union players from Johannesburg
Afrikaner people
South African people of Dutch descent
Rugby union flankers
South African rugby union players
South Africa international rugby union players
Saracens F.C. players
Golden Lions players
Lions (United Rugby Championship) players
Bulls (rugby union) players
Blue Bulls players
South African expatriate rugby union players
Expatriate rugby union players in England
South African expatriate sportspeople in England